Frances Burroughs was an American film editor who worked on Victor Adamson's low-budget Western B movies of the 1930s.

Selected filmography 

 Desert Mesa (1935)
 Boss Cowboy (1934)
 The Rawhide Terror (1934)
 Range Riders (1934)
 Rawhide Romance (1934)
 Riding Speed (1934) 
 Circle Canyon (1933) 
 The Fighting Cowboy (1933)

References

External links

1900 births
1998 deaths
American film editors
American women film editors
Artists from Illinois